Southern State Community College (SSCC) is a public community college based in Hillsboro, Ohio. SSCC has two campuses, with one in Mount Orab ("Brown County campus") and the other in Hillsboro ("Central campus"). Southern State Community College was founded in February 1975 as Southern State General and Technical College. The name of the school was changed only a few years later in 1977 to the name it is known by now.

History 
Southern State Community College was chartered in February 1975 as Southern State General and Technical College to serve Adams, Brown, Clinton, Fayette and Highland Counties. In April 1975, the University of Cincinnati's Board of Trustees indicated its support of the college district which encompassed UC's Tri-County Academic Center at Macon. In 1977, the name of the college was officially changed to Southern State Community College.

A new South Campus facility opened in Brown County for academic year 1976–1977, and former Clinton County Air Force base buildings were renovated for use as the North Campus near Wilmington.

In March 1981 another milestone was reached when the administrative offices for the college were moved from their North Campus location to a new 4,000-square-foot facility in Hillsboro.

September 1981 saw the beginning of Southern State's Practical Nursing program and in 1985 our largest facility, the Central Campus in Hillsboro, opened for autumn quarter. Central Campus houses the technology programs and related general studies courses. 

In 1986, the Associate of Applied Science in Nursing program (RN) was added. Both nursing programs are now housed in a health technologies wing which was added to Central Campus for academic year 1994–1995. Located on the south side of the main campus, it is directly opposite an agriculture wing which was constructed in 1990.

The Appalachian Gateway Center opened on the South Campus in September 1999. The center serves as a focal point for the community with a focus on cultural and educational programs relating to Appalachian culture. In May 2000, Southern State opened its North Campus facility in Wilmington, a 35,000-square-foot campus constructed.

In May 2006, following a comprehensive self-study and the evaluation of the North Central Association of Colleges and Schools, Southern State was granted accreditation by the association. Since that time, accreditation has continued with the next evaluation visit scheduled for academic year 2015–2016.

The fifth president of the college, Dr. Kevin S. Boys, began his term in January 2010. He was preceded by Dr. Sherry A. Stout (2007–2009), Dr. Lawrence N. Dukes (1995–2007), Dr. George McCormick (1989–1994) and Dr. Lewis Miller (1975–1988).

In August 2014, Southern State replaced the South Campus location with the new Brown County Campus. This is a 50,000-square-foot facility.

In 2015–2016, following a comprehensive reaffirmation visit by the Higher Learner Commission, Southern State affirmed accreditation and entry into the Open Pathway. This pathway follows a 10-year cycle inclusive of assurance reviews, quality initiative projects, and comprehensive evaluation. It affords Southern State the opportunity to pursue improvement projects that meet current needs and institutional aspirations. A four-year assurance review was submitted and accepted without qualification in 2020 and the next comprehensive reaffirmation of accreditation is scheduled for 2025–2026.

In May 2020, Southern State put forward a plan for efficiency that involved adjustments to the physical footprint in Clinton County and the introduction of shared spaces with neighboring Wilmington College, Laurel Oaks Career Center, and locations in adjacent counties. This strategy was designed to continue to serve the residents of Clinton County with less reliance of a facility of its own.

References

External links

Community colleges in Ohio
Educational institutions established in 1975
Education in Highland County, Ohio
Education in Fayette County, Ohio
Education in Clinton County, Ohio
Education in Brown County, Ohio
USCAA member institutions
Hillsboro, Ohio